Ryan Bomben (born May 16, 1987) is a professional Canadian football offensive guard who is currently a free agent. He most recently played for the Toronto Argonauts of the Canadian Football League (CFL). He is a four-time East Division All-Star and has also played for the Montreal Alouettes and Hamilton Tiger-Cats. Bomben played CIS football for the Guelph Gryphons.

Professional career
He was originally drafted 31st overall by the Montreal Alouettes in the 2010 CFL Draft. In 2011 and 2012 with the Alouettes, he dressed in all 36 games as a back-up offensive lineman. He scored his first professional touchdown on October 28, 2012 on a five-yard reception and record five receptions for 33 yards in 2012 as a tight end. In 2013, he became a regular starter at offensive guard, starting 15 regular season games while dressing in all 18. He started all 18 regular season games in 2014 as well as starting both playoff games that year.

Bomben was obtained by the Hamilton Tiger-Cats prior to the start of the 2015 CFL Draft, in exchange for their first-round pick (eighth overall, used to select Jacob Ruby, OL, Richmond) and third-round pick (24th overall, used to select James Bodanis, OL, Michigan State). He played in 12 games for the Tiger-Cats in 2015, starting in 11 at right guard, before suffering a season-ending injury on October 23, 2015 against the BC Lions. He had signed a three-year contract extension with Hamilton on October 15, 2015. He was named an East Division All-Star that year which was the first of his career. He continued his strong play in 2016, starting all 18 regular season games at right guard while being named the Tiger-Cats' Most Outstanding Offensive Lineman and another East Division All-Star award. In 2017, he once again started all 18 regular season games and was named an East Division All-Star. 

On May 2, 2018, he was traded along with Hamilton’s second overall selection in the 2018 CFL Draft, wide receiver Jamal Robinson, a fourth round pick (34th overall) in 2018, a seventh round pick (56th overall) in 2018, and rights to an undisclosed negotiation list player, for Montreal's first overall pick in 2018, a fourth round pick (31st overall) in 2018, a sixth round pick (44th overall) in 2018, and a second round pick (would become 10th overall) in 2019. He played and started in six games for the Alouettes in his return to Montreal. However, the reunion was short-lived as the Alouettes traded Bomben and a 2020 fifth-round pick to the Toronto Argonauts in exchange for T.J. Heath and a 2020 third-round pick on July 29, 2018. He dressed in 12 games for the Argonauts, starting 11, and was once again named an East Division All-Star for his combined play with the Alouettes and Argonauts. He played in 17 regular season games in 2019 and started 13 at right guard. He was released by the Argonauts on February 3, 2020.

References

External links
 Toronto Argonauts bio

1987 births
Living people
Canadian football offensive linemen
Guelph Gryphons football players
Montreal Alouettes players
Players of Canadian football from Ontario
Sportspeople from Burlington, Ontario
Hamilton Tiger-Cats players
Toronto Argonauts players